Coffee is the surname of:

 Claire Coffee (born 1980), American actress
 Glen Coffee (born 1987), former American football running back
 Glenn Coffee (born 1967), American lawyer and politician
 Harry B. Coffee (1890–1972), American politician
 Jerome Coffee (born 1958), American former bantamweight boxer
 John Coffee (disambiguation)
 Lenore Coffee (1896–1984), American screenwriter, playwright and novelist
 Linda Coffee (born 1942), one of the two attorneys who argued the case of Roe v. Wade before the Supreme Court
 Pat Coffee (born 1915), American former National Football League halfback
 Paul Coffee (born 1956), American retired soccer goalkeeper
 Richard J. Coffee (1925-2017), American politician
 W. J. Coffee (1774–1846), English artist and sculptor

See also
 Coffey (surname)